Karnali Province is one of the seven federal provinces of Nepal established by the country's new constitution of 20 September 2015, comprising ten districts, namely, Dailekh, Dolpa, Humla, Jajarkot, Jumla, Kalikot, Mugu, Salyan, Surkhet and Western Rukum. This province is formerly known as Province No. 6, then as Karnali Pradesh. There are many categorized monuments sites in Karnali Province.

Lists per district of Karnali Province 
 List of monuments in Dailekh District
 List of monuments in Dolpa District
 List of monuments in Humla District
 List of monuments in Jajarkot District
 List of monuments in Jumla District
 List of monuments in Kalikot District
 List of monuments in Mugu District
 List of monuments in Salyan District
 List of monuments in Surkhet District
 List of monuments in Western Rukum District (see list of monuments in the former Rukum District)

References 

Karnali Province